"Mother Universe" is a single taken from the Soup Dragons album Lovegod. The original version, "hinging on a Marc Bolan riff", was initially ignored and regarded according to Rage Magazine as 'weird'. However, after the considerable success of the album's second single, "I'm Free", Mother Universe was reworked to give it a similar feel, substituting a gospel-style chorus for guitar chords and adding various whoops and small elements of toasting. The new version reached 26 in the UK Charts and was later re-issued in the US backed by "Sweetmeat". Despite the latter version's greater success, lead singer Sean Dickson has stated his preference for the original version.

Cover Art
The original version featured a bowed headed Madonna figure in colour reversed reds. The remix version cover art featured a stylised blue fly with orange wings.

Track listing

UK downtempo promo 7-inch; 1989
 Mother Universe 7:28
 Mother Universe (Mother Dub) 6:23

UK, October 1990 Remix
 Mother Universe (7" Version) 3:50
 Dream-E-4-Ever (Live) 4:05
 Mother Universe (12" Version) 7:29

UK, October 1990 CD
 Mother Universe (Love Dub)
 4-Way Brain
 Mother Universe (Solar Dub)

US Release
 Mother Universe (12" Version)
 Mother Universe
 Sweetmeat
 Softly

Canadian Release
 Mother Universe (12") 7:30
 Dream Forever (Live) 5:35
 Sweetmeat (12") 6:14
 Softly (Live) 4:16
 Backwards Dog (12") 6:07
 4-Way Brain 2:33

Charts

References

External links
 Original version of "Mother Universe" on YouTube
 Second version of "Mother Universe" on YouTube

1990 singles
1990 songs
The Soup Dragons songs